OBVI may refer to:

OBVI - Office for the Blind and Visually Impaired, Wisconsin Department of Health Services
OBVI, Opera Breve Vocal Intensive Carroll Freeman
OBVI files, from Obvious Technology, Object-Based Video Interface circa 1999